is a railway station located in the town of  Nakayama, Yamagata Prefecture, Japan, operated by the  East Japan Railway Company (JR East).

Lines
Uzen-Nagasaki Station is served by the Aterazawa Line, and is located 11.0 rail kilometers from the terminus of the line at Kita-Yamagata Station.

Station layout
The station was built with a single island platforms connected to the station building by a footbridge. However, with the opening of the west exit in 2004, the tracks on the west wide of the platform were removed, making the station effectively a side platform with trains in both directions using the same side of the platform. The station is a staffed Kan'i itaku station.

History
Uzen-Nagasaki Station began operation on December 11, 1921 With the privatization of the JNR on April 1, 1987, the station came under the control of the East Japan Railway Company.

Passenger statistics
In fiscal 2018, the station was used by an average of 376 passengers daily (boarding passengers only).

Surrounding area

 Yamagata Prefectural Baseball Stadium
 Nakayama High School
Nagasaki Elementary School

References

External links 

 Uzen-Nagasaki Station (JR East) 

Railway stations in Yamagata Prefecture
Aterazawa Line
Railway stations in Japan opened in 1921
Nakayama, Yamagata